The Parliament of Montenegro is the unicameral legislature of Montenegro. The Parliament currently has 81 members, with each member elected to a four-year term. Following the 2006 independence referendum, the Parliament declared and ratified the independence of Montenegro on 3 June 2006. Members of the house are elected using proportional representation.

History
The Parliament of Montenegro was initially established by the Constitution of the Principality of Montenegro in 1905 and was called the Popular Assembly (Narodna skupština). It had a limited legislative role, limited by the authority of the Knjaz (Prince). The first parliament was constituted in 1906. Following the incorporation of the Kingdom of Montenegro into the Kingdom of Yugoslavia in 1918, the Parliament of Montenegro was disbanded until World War II. The Parliament was reinstated in 1944, in the form of the Montenegrin Antifascist Assembly of National Liberation (CASNO), which changed its name to the Montenegrin National Assembly, and later the National Assembly. This lasted until 1946, when a new Assembly was elected for the FR Montenegro, a constituent republic within the SFR Yugoslavia. The current parliament is the 23rd since the foundation of the Parliament.

Powers
The Parliament appoints the Prime Minister nominated by the President, as well as the ministers chosen by the Prime Minister. Parliament also passes all laws in Montenegro, ratifies international treaties, appoints justices of all courts, adopts the budget and performs other duties as established by the Constitution. The Parliament can pass a vote of no-confidence in the Government with a majority of the members.

Deputies
A deputy has a four-year term. One deputy is elected per 6,000 voters, which in turn results in a change of total number of deputies in the parliament. Current assembly convening comprises 81 deputies.

Elections

The Parliament has 81 members (deputies) elected by a D'Hondt method system of proportional representation for a four-year term.

The 81 seats of the Parliament of Montenegro are elected in a single nationwide constituency by closed list proportional representation. Seats are allocated using the d'Hondt method with a three percent electoral threshold. Minority groups that account for at least 15 percent of the population in a district are given an exemption that lowers the electoral threshold to 0.7 percent if their list fails to cross the three percent threshold. For ethnic Croats, if no list representing the population passes the 0.7 percent threshold, the list with the most votes will win one seat if it receives more than 0.35 percent of the vote.

2020 parliamentary election

Current parliamentary parties list

See also
President of the Parliament of Montenegro

References

External links

Politics of Montenegro
Political organisations based in Montenegro
Government of Montenegro
Montenegro
Montenegro
Montenegro